Topolski (feminine: Topolska, plural: Topolscy) is a Polish surname. It may refer to:
 Carol Topolski (born 1949), an English novelist
 Daniel Topolski (born 1945), an author, former rower and rowing coach, and broadcaster on BBC Radio
 Feliks Topolski (1907–1989), a Polish-British expressionist painter
 Jerzy Topolski (1928–1998), a Polish historian
 Joshua Topolsky (born 1977, Pittsburgh), an American technology journalist, co-founder and editor-in-chief of technology news network The Verge, and a US music producer and drummer under the stage name Joshua Ryan.
 Robb Topolski, an American computer networking expert

See also
 Topol (disambiguation)
 Topolski Century

Polish-language surnames
Jewish surnames